Cerkovicë (Tserkovitsa) is a village in the Vlorë County in Albania. At the 2015 local government reform it became part of the municipality Finiq. It is inhabited solely by Greeks.

Nearest places
Leshnicë e Poshtme
Leshnicë e Sipërme
Maliçan
Shëndre

References

Greek communities in Albania
Populated places in Finiq
Villages in Vlorë County